The 1961 Texas Longhorns baseball team represented the University of Texas at Austin in the 1961 NCAA University Division baseball season. The Longhorns played their home games at Clark Field. The team was coached by Bibb Falk in his 19th season at Texas.

The Longhorns reached the College World Series, but were eliminated after losing their first two games to Southern California and Western Michigan.

Personnel

Roster

Schedule and results

References

Texas Longhorns baseball seasons
Texas Longhorns
Southwest Conference baseball champion seasons
College World Series seasons
Texas Longhorns